Ivar Sigmundsson (born 5 May 1942) is an Icelandic alpine skier. He competed in two events at the 1968 Winter Olympics.

References

1942 births
Living people
Ivar Sigmundsson
Ivar Sigmundsson
Alpine skiers at the 1968 Winter Olympics
Ivar Sigmundsson
20th-century Icelandic people